The 2007 Brno Superbike World Championship round was the ninth round of the 2007 Superbike World Championship. It took place on the weekend of July 20–22, 2007, at the Masaryk Circuit located in Brno.

Superbike race 1 classification

Superbike race 2 classification

Supersport race classification

References 
 Superbike Race 1
 Superbike Race 2
 Supersport Race

Brno Round
Superbike